A positive locking device is a device used in conjunction with a fastener in order to positively lock the fastener. This means that the fastener cannot work loose from vibrations. The following is a list of positive locking devices:

A split beam nut
A castellated nut and a split pin
A hex nut or cap screw and a tab washer
A hex nut or cap screw and a lock plate
Safety wiring with various types of fasteners

References

Fasteners